The 2015 Copa do Brasil First Round was played from 25 February to 30 April 2015, deciding the 40 teams that advanced to the Second Round.

First round

|}

Match 1

Palmeiras advanced directly due to winning by 2 or more goals difference.

Match 2

Sampaio Corrêa won 6–4 on aggregate.

Match 3

Vitória won 2–1 on aggregate.

Match 4

ASA advanced directly due to winning by 2 or more goals difference.

Match 5

Botafogo-RJ won 6–4 on aggregate.

Match 6

Capivariano won 3–0 on aggregate.

Match 7

Figueirense won 4–3 on aggregate.

Match 8

Avaí won 3–1 on aggregate.

Match 9

Santos won 2–0 on aggregate.

Match 10

Tied 3–3 on aggregate, Maringá won on away goals.

Match 11

Sport won 6–2 on aggregate.

Match 12

Chapecoense advanced directly due to winning by 2 or more goals difference.

Match 13

Flamengo won 4–1 on aggregate.

Match 14

Salgueiro advanced directly due to winning by 2 or more goals difference.

Match 15

Náutico won 3–0 on aggregate.

Match 16

Tied 1–1 on aggregate, Jacuipense won on penalties.

Match 17

Goiás won 2–0 on aggregate.

Match 18

Independente won 5–2 on aggregate.

Match 19

Portuguesa advanced directly due to winning by 2 or more goals difference.

Match 20

Ituano won 3–1 on aggregate.

Match 21

Coritiba advanced directly due to winning by 2 or more goals difference.

Match 22

Fortaleza won 3–1 on aggregate.

Match 23

Ponte Preta won 4–1 on aggregate.

Match 24

Tied 2–2 on aggregate, Moto Club won on penalties.

Match 25

Vasco da Gama won 5–3 on aggregate.

Match 26

Cuiabá won 4–3 on aggregate.

Match 27

Atlético Goianiense won 3–1 on aggregate.

Match 28

América de Natal advanced directly due to winning by 2 or more goals difference.

Match 29

Tied 2–2 on aggregate, Atlético Paranaense won on penalties.

Match 30

Tupi advanced directly due to winning by 2 or more goals difference.

Match 31

Ceará won 1–0 on aggregate.

Match 32

América Mineiro advanced directly due to winning by 2 or more goals difference.

Match 33

Grêmio won 4–1 on aggregate.

Match 34

CRB won 3–1 on aggregate.

Match 35

Criciúma advanced directly due to winning by 2 or more goals difference.

Match 36

Tied 2–2 on aggregate, Bragantino won on away goals.

Match 37

Bahia won 3–2 on aggregate.

Match 38

Luverdense won 2–1 on aggregate.

Match 39

ABC won 3–0 on aggregate.

Match 40

Paysandu won 4–2 on aggregate.

Notes

References

1